The Poland Railroad Station is an historic former train station at the corner of Poland Corner and Plains Roads in Poland, Maine.  Built in 1901 by the Maine Central Railroad, it is one of the state's best-preserved turn-of-the-century small railroad stations.  Now converted to private residential use in a historically sensitive manner, it was listed on the National Register of Historic Places in 1980.

Description and history
The former Poland Railroad Station is located along a former railroad right-of-way northeast of the village center of Poland, at the southern corner of Poland Corner and Plains Roads.  It is a single story wood-frame structure, with broad overhanging hip roof and two interior chimneys.  It is clad primarily in horizontal clapboards, with a band of vertical boards.  The roof eaves are supported by relatively simple large knee brackets.  The interior of the building has retained its original partitions, and the ticket office with window grill is still in place, despite the building's conversion to residential use.

The station was built in 1901, on a side line built from the Grand Trunk Railway by the Maine Central Railroad to provide service to Poland village and the Poland Spring Resort a bit further to the south.  The rail line formerly ran along what is now the driveway for the residence, and extended from Lewiston to Mechanic Falls.  This station is both a well-kept example of Maine's railroad stations of the period, and is one of the best examples of their residential conversion.

See also
National Register of Historic Places listings in Androscoggin County, Maine

References

Railway stations on the National Register of Historic Places in Maine
Houses on the National Register of Historic Places in Maine
Railway stations in the United States opened in 1901
Maine Central Railroad stations
Transportation buildings and structures in Androscoggin County, Maine
National Register of Historic Places in Androscoggin County, Maine
1901 establishments in Maine
Former railway stations in Maine